Amorphosoma is a genus of beetles in the family Buprestidae, containing the following species:

 Amorphosoma apicale Kerremans, 1897
 Amorphosoma gounellei Kerremans, 1897
 Amorphosoma minutum Kerremans, 1897
 Amorphosoma penicillatum (Klug, 1827)
 Amorphosoma tasmanicum Germar, 1848
 Amorphosoma undulatum Kerremans, 1897

References

Buprestidae genera